Bharat Mihir was an Indian publishing company and newspaper which published in Bengal during the colonial British Raj. It had branches in Calcutta and Mymensingh (now in Bangladesh). It was banned by the 1878 Vernacular Press Act of the British government.

References

Publishing in India
Defunct newspapers published in India
Bengal Presidency
Publications with year of establishment missing
1878 disestablishments in India
Publications disestablished in 1878